Mary Joe Fernández was the defending champion but lost in the quarterfinals to Amanda Coetzer.

Steffi Graf won in the final 6–0, 6–4 against Coetzer.

Seeds
A champion seed is indicated in bold text while text in italics indicates the round in which that seed was eliminated.

  Steffi Graf (champion)
  Mary Joe Fernández (quarterfinals)
  Lindsay Davenport (semifinals)
  Natasha Zvereva (quarterfinals)
  Helena Suková (first round)
  Amanda Coetzer (final)
  Sabine Hack (first round)
  Judith Wiesner (quarterfinals)

Draw

External links
 1994 Evert Cup Draw

Singles
1994 Newsweek Champions Cup and the Evert Cup